The System for Differential Corrections and Monitoring (SDCM), is the satellite-based navigation augmentation system operated by Russia's Roscosmos space agency to augment the precision of the GLONASS satellite navigation system. It uses the Luch Multifunctional Space Relay System to transmit correction data.

SDCM's service area covers the Russian Federation.  it had not yet been certified for use for public aviation.

References

External links 
 Design summary for SDCM, 2012

Navigation satellite constellations
Satellite-based augmentation systems